The Olympus E-3 was until 2010 Olympus Corporation's flagship camera, positioned as a professional DSLR camera. It is the successor to the Olympus E-1, which was launched in November 2003. The E-3, originally codenamed Olympus E-P1, was announced on 17 October 2007. The E-3, like the other cameras in the Olympus E-series, conforms to the Four Thirds system. It was succeeded in 2010 by the Olympus E-5 professional DSLR flagship camera.

Features
The E-3 has several novel features, including a live preview full articulating screen, autofocus in live view mode, the ability to capture a scene with wide dynamic range using an image processing method called shadow adjustment technology  and the ability to control up to three wireless flash groups without external transmitters. The camera is also fully weatherproof even with the popup flash in the "up" position.

The camera, with the new SWD (ultrasonic motor) lenses, is expected to appeal to professional users who want a rugged, portable and lightweight camera body with quality lenses and class leading autofocus.

Additional features include:
 Fast autofocus (Olympus claims that this was the world's fastest autofocus at the time the camera was released (when used with the Olympus Zuiko Digital ED 12-60mm f/2.8-4 SWD lens at 60mm, as of October 2007).
 100% viewfinder with ×1.15 magnification with a 50 mm lens (as 25 mm is the "standard" lens on the 4/3 format, this is equivalent to ×0.57 in 35 mm format)
 External white balance sensor
 5 frames per second (frame/s) capture speed
 11 point biaxial cross AF sensor that works at −2 EV at ISO 100
 In-body image stabilization achieved by moving the sensor (thus, it works with any lens)
 Environmentally sealed magnesium alloy camera body
 Dust reduction system (Supersonic Wave Filter)
 Shutter tested to 150,000 cycles
 Internal Viewfinder shutter
 'X' sync and External remote ports

The camera is compatible with existing BLM-1 batteries used in the E-1, E-300, E-330, E-500 and E-510.

The camera was reviewed by Digital Photography Review in February 2008 by Simon Joinson.

The E-3 is equipped with a better sensor than other DSLRs marketed by Olympus at the time of its release, allowing the user to operate at higher ISO settings without producing as much noise.

Along with other Olympus 4/3rds bodies, the E-3 has a very 'maintenance free' approach due to it having on-demand pixel mapping, the SSWF 'dust shaker', vignetting and distortion correction either in-camera or during editing with Olympus software. Olympus have also implemented on-demand firmware updates for all their bodies, lens and flash units.

References

External links 

 
 Olympus E-3 Official Specifications
 Official Olympus E-3 Image samples
 Olympus E-3 Launch event in New York covered by Imaging Resource
 SLR클럽 OLYMPUS E 시리즈 포럼 Olympus E-3 revealed in Korea
 행복쇼핑의 시작 ! 다나와 (가격비교) - Danawa.com Video of Olympus E-3 revealed in Korea
 Olympus Engineers Interview on E-P1
 Olympus E-P1 Leaked Info
 Gizmodo more E-P1 info leaked
 Olympus Corp schedules E-P1 for 2007
 Youtube video Olympus E prototype
 The E-3 Development History by Zone-10 LLC
 Olympus E-3 Sample Photos and Tests
 Photography with Olympus E-3

E-3
Live-preview digital cameras
Four Thirds System
Cameras introduced in 2007